The grey-headed antbird (Ampelornis griseiceps) is a species of bird in the family Thamnophilidae. It is found in Ecuador and Peru.

Its natural habitats are subtropical or tropical dry forests, subtropical or tropical moist lowland forests, and subtropical or tropical moist montane forests. It is threatened by habitat loss.

The grey-headed antbird was described by the American ornithologist Frank Chapman in 1923 and given the binomial name Myrmoderus griseiceps. It was later placed in the genus Myrmeciza but a molecular phylogenetic study published in 2013 found that the genus Myrmeciza, as then defined, was polyphyletic. In the resulting rearrangement to create monophyletic genera the gray-headed antbird was moved to a newly erected genus Ampelornis. The name combines the Ancient Greek words ampelos "vine" and ornis "bird". The genus is monotypic.

References

External links
BirdLife Species Factsheet.

grey-headed antbird
Birds of the Ecuadorian Andes
Birds of the Peruvian Andes
grey-headed antbird
Taxonomy articles created by Polbot